John Martin (born 1962) is a British comedian, writer and author.

Comedian

Martin was born in Liverpool, England, in 1962. He is a professional comedian and became the UK's first Government sponsored comedian when he received £40 a week under the enterprise allowance scheme. Since then, Martin has travelled the world with his clean, fresh comedy.

Martin has spent years writing material for comedy stars including Ken Dodd, Jimmy Tarbuck and Bob Monkhouse.  He has written for the Royal Variety Performance and the National Lottery. His television appearances include Today With Des & Mel on ITV. Sir Ken Dodd on ITV's Parkinson described Martin as "a marvelous comedian" and named Martin as his personal favourite comedian today.

In February 1993, Martin entered the Guinness Book of Records for continuously telling jokes for 101 hours 39 minutes.

Author

From an early age, Martin has had a passion for military history.  One particular story grabbed his attention that he spent years researching, resulting in him writing a book.

Martin has written a book on the assassination of Reinhard Heydrich, entitled, The Mirror Caught the Sun: Operation Anthropoid 1942.

References

External links

Official Twitter

Living people
English male comedians
English stand-up comedians
Comedians from Liverpool
1962 births